Siphonochelus mozambicus is a species of sea snail, a marine gastropod mollusk, in the family Muricidae, the murex snails or rock snails.

Description
The length of the shell attains 53.9 mm.

Distribution
This marine species occurs in the Mozambique Channel.

References

External links
 Houart, R. (2017). Siphonochelus japonicus (A. Adams, 1863) and Siphonochelus nipponensis Keen & Campbell, 1964, and their intricate history with the description of a new Siphonochelus species from Mozambique (Gastropoda: Muricidae). Venus. 75 (1-4): 27-38

mozambicus
Gastropods described in 2017